Sebastian Karlsson may refer to:

 Sebastian Karlsson (singer), Swedish singer
 Sebastian Karlsson (ice hockey), Swedish ice hockey player